Gitschtal (Slovene: Višprijska dolina) is a town in the district of Hermagor in the Austrian state of Carinthia.

Geography
The municipality lies next to Hermagor to the northwest. Its principal stream is the Gössering, which flows into the Gail south of Hermagor.

The floor of the valley is about a kilometer wide.

References

Cities and towns in Hermagor District
Gailtal Alps